Adhoora Bandhan is a 2017 Pakistani drama serial directed by Shah Hussain, produced by Babar Javed, and written by Huma Hina Nafees. The drama stars Nauman Masood, Faria Sheikh and Erum Akhtar. and was first aired on 9 October 2017 on Geo Entertainment. It airs every Friday and Saturday night at 7:00 pm.

Cast
Faria Sheikh as Ifrah
Nauman Masood as Yasir
Erum Akhtar as Rozina
Farah Shah as Sarwat
Madiha Rizvi as Atiya
Sohail Sameer as Safdar Hussain
Yasir Ali Khan as Daniyal
Ramsha Khan as Komal
Naeem Tahir as Col. Zahid
Furqan Qureshi as Shahmeer
Rashid Farooqui as Aijaz
Farah Nadeem as Tabbassum
Hafsa Butt as Natasha

References

External links
Adhoor Bandhan- Harpal Geo

Pakistani drama television series
Urdu-language television shows
2017 Pakistani television series debuts
Geo TV original programming